Libby Gill is a leadership speaker, executive coach and author in Los Angeles, California. She also is the CEO of Libby Gill & Company, an executive coaching and consulting firm. Previously, Gill was Senior Vice President at Universal Studios Television, and Vice President at Sony Pictures Television and Turner Broadcasting.

She is a former columnist for The Dallas Morning News.

Early life and education
Gill was born in New York and raised in Mandarin, Florida. She was one of six children and the daughter of a psychiatrist. She attended California State University, Long Beach and earned a degree in theater.

Career
In 1995, she was appointed to senior vice president of media relations at the MCA Television group. Gill had senior leadership positions at Turner Broadcasting, Universal Studios and Sony Pictures Entertainment for fifteen years before founding Libby Gill & Company, an executive coaching and consulting firm, in November 2000. Her clients include AMC Networks, Avery Dennison, CA Technologies, Disney-ABC, Kellogg's, Microsoft, PayPal, Wells Fargo, and others. 

She began writing about her experiences as an executive and teaching at a local university. She has also taught at California State, Northridge. She authored four books and shared her experiences in Time, The New York Times, and The Wall Street Journal.  

Stay-At-Home Dads (2001) was written about her family's experiences when she was making more money than her husband and they decided he would be a stay-at-home dad. After ten years of her husband being the primary caregiver in the house, she wrote the book. The journal, Adolescence, called it a "step by step blueprint for transitioning into a stay-at-home-dad family." 

Traveling Hopefully: How to Lose Your Baggage and Jumpstart Your Life (2005) includes personal stories from her own childhood traumas.  In 2010, Gill's book You Unstuck: Mastering the New Rules of Risk-taking in Work and Life (2009) won an Independent Publishers Award in 2010. She earned a silver award and was tied with Leanne Cusumano Roque who wrote Live Light: Simple Steps. 

Gill was the media consultant for the Dr Phil television show. The Desert Sun called her "the brains behind the Dr. Phil show."

Personal life
Gill lives in Medford, Oregon with her husband, attorney David Stern, and is the mother of two sons.

Bibliography
Stay-At-Home Dads: The Essential Guide to Creating the New Family (2001), 
Traveling Hopefully: How to Lose Your Family Baggage and Jumpstart Your Life (2005), 
You Unstuck: Mastering the New Rules of Risk-Taking at Work and in Life (2009),  
Capture the Mindshare and the Market Share Will Follow: The Art and Science of Building Brands (2013), 
The Hope-Driven Leader: Harness the Power of Positivity at Work (2018), 
Leadership Reckoning: Can Higher Education Develop the Leaders We Need?(2021, with Thomas Kolditz and Ryan P. Brown),

References

External links
Official Website

American motivational writers
Women motivational writers
Living people
American motivational speakers
The Dallas Morning News people
1954 births
People from Jacksonville, Florida
Women motivational speakers
California State University, Long Beach alumni